Dysin Mayo (born May 22, 1997) is a Canadian professional ice hockey defenceman currently playing for the Henderson Silver Knights in the American Hockey League (AHL) while under contract to the Vegas Golden Knights of the National Hockey League (NHL).

Playing career
He played junior hockey with the Edmonton Oil Kings and was drafted by the Coyotes in the fifth-round, 133rd overall, of the 2014 NHL Entry Draft. He was signed to a three-year, entry-level contract with the Arizona Coyotes during the 2015–16 season, on December 27, 2015.

Approaching his seventh season within the Coyotes organization, Mayo began the  season familiarly assigned to AHL affiliate, the Tucson Roadrunners, in which he was selected as team captain as the longest tenured player in his sixth year with the club. With the season underway Mayo played just two games with the Roadrunners before he was recalled by the Coyotes on October 18, 2021. He made his long-awaited NHL debut with the Coyotes, becoming the first Coyote defenseman to score in his debut since Tony DeAngelo in 2016, in a 5–1 defeat to the Edmonton Oilers on October 21, 2021.

On February 25, 2022, Mayo was signed by the Coyotes to a three-year, $2.85 million contract extension.

During the  season, while assigned to the Roadrunners, Mayo was traded by the Coyotes to the Vegas Golden Knights in exchange for a 2023 fifth-round pick and the contract of Shea Weber.

Career statistics

Regular season and playoffs

International

Awards and honours

References

External links

1996 births
Living people
Arizona Coyotes draft picks
Arizona Coyotes players
Edmonton Oil Kings players
Henderson Silver Knights players
Ice hockey people from British Columbia
Rapid City Rush players
Sportspeople from Victoria, British Columbia
Springfield Falcons players
Tucson Roadrunners players